Chakravyuham is a Telugu suspense film directed by Balu Mahendra starring Suman, Gautami, and Archana. The music was composed by Maestro Ilaiyaraaja. This movie was released in the year 1992.

Plot

The story revolves around Archana who was once attempted to be killed by the antagonist, a psychopath. Suman, as a reporter to a newspaper, helps Archana to chase the antagonists after Archana disguises as pop singer to trap him.

Cast
Suman
Archana
Gowthami
Allu Ramalingaiah
Pradeep Shakthi

Soundtrack
The soundtrack features 5 songs composed by Ilaiyaraaja.

"Naa Sari Sogasari" - Chithra
"Asalu Pooche" - S. P. Balasubrahmanyam, Chithra
"Kougiline" - S. P. Sailaja 
"Gokulame Needira" - Chithra
"Lip Kiss Lippu Ragam" - S. P. Balasubrahmanyam, Chithra
"Vampuko Sompunnadi" - Chithra

Awards
Gowthami won Nandi Award for Best Supporting Actress for this film

References

External links
 

1992 films
1990s Telugu-language films
Films directed by Balu Mahendra
Films shot in Ooty
Films scored by Ilaiyaraaja